The 2020 ECAC Hockey Men's Ice Hockey Tournament was the 59th tournament in league history. It was scheduled to be played between March 6 and March 21, 2020. First Round and Quarterfinal games were played at home team campus sites, while the Semifinal and Championship games were to be played at the Herb Brooks Arena in Lake Placid, New York.

On Sunday, March 8, 2020 Rensselaer announced that their quarterfinal series against Harvard scheduled for March 13–15 would be played without fans in attendance due to the COVID-19 pandemic. Three days later, on March 11, it was announced that Harvard would not allow their team to travel to Rensselaer and withdrew from the tournament due to coronavirus fears. Yale also withdrew from the tournament on March 11 and it was decided to reseed the tournament with Cornell and Clarkson being given byes to the semifinals. Previously on March 10, 2020 Cornell had announced that fans would not be allowed at their quarterfinal series against Princeton. On March 12, ECAC Hockey announced that the remainder of the tournament was cancelled due to the COVID-19 pandemic.

Format 
The tournament features four rounds of play. The teams that finish above fifth place in the standings received a bye to the quarterfinal round. In the first round, the fifth and twelfth seeds, the sixth and eleventh seeds, the seventh and tenth seeds and the eighth and ninth seeds played a best-of-three series with the winners advancing to the quarterfinals. In the quarterfinals the one seed played the lowest remaining seed, the second seed played the second-lowest remaining seed, the third seed played the third-lowest remaining seed and the fourth seed played the fourth-lowest remaining seed in another best-of-three series with the winners of these the series advancing to the semifinals. In the semifinals the top remaining seed played the lowest remaining seed while the two remaining teams play against each other. The winners of the semifinals play in the championship game, and no third-place game is played. All series after the quarterfinals are single-elimination games. The tournament champion receives an automatic bid to the 2020 NCAA Division I Men's Ice Hockey Tournament.

Conference standings

Bracket
Teams are reseeded for the Quarterfinals and Semifinals. Bracket below represents tournament as it was to be played just prior to cancellation, after Harvard and Yale had withdrawn.

Note: * denotes overtime period(s)

Results

First round

References

ECAC Tournament
ECAC Hockey Men's Ice Hockey Tournament
ECAC Hockey Men's Ice Hockey Tournament
College sports in New York (state)
Ice hockey in New York (state)
Sports in Lake Placid, New York
ECAC Hockey Men's Ice Hockey Tournament
ECAC Hockey Men's Ice Hockey Tournament